Aspire TV was an Australian advertorial datacasting channel launched on 21 May 2013. The channel operated a full-time format of mostly US produced paid programming and, to a lesser extent, other paid program content including religious programming. Though datacasting was intended by the Labor government of the time to broadcast telecourses and other non-commercial content, without any legislative restriction on its use, most Australian broadcasters have utilized the datacasting services for teleshopping instead. For the most part however, the general public has ignored these datacasting teleshopping channels, resulting in their swift discontinuation.

Aspire TV ceased broadcasting in Tasmania and Darwin on 29 August 2015 in order to accommodate for the launch of Racing.com; and in Spencer Gulf, SA and Broken Hill, NSW via SGS/SCN on 1 July 2016. In Northern NSW, Aspire TV ceased broadcasting via Ten Northern NSW on 31 August 2017, due to rival WIN Television taking over ownership of NRN. In Southern NSW, Regional Victoria and Regional Queensland, Aspire TV ceased broadcasting on 31 July 2021 to accommodate for the launch of Sky News Regional.

The design graphics for this channel were designed by Lucid Edge.

See also

List of digital television channels in Australia

References

Defunct television channels in Australia
Southern Cross Media Group
English-language television stations in Australia
Television channels and stations established in 2013
Television channels and stations disestablished in 2021
Home shopping television stations in Australia